Ballinagar (historically Bellanagar, from ) is a village in County Offaly, Ireland. It lies on the R402 regional road, roughly midway between Daingean and Tullamore.

The Church of St. Joseph, built in 1837, serves as the Roman Catholic parish church in the village. The local national school, also named St. Joseph's, originally opened in 1949 but moved to a new building in 2011/2012. The village has a pub named Tom and Jerry's bar.

References

See also
 List of towns and villages in the Republic of Ireland

Towns and villages in County Offaly